Redondo Lee "Donnie" Gardner (born February 17, 1968) is a former American football defensive end. He was drafted by the Tampa Bay Buccaneers in the seventh round of the 1990 NFL Draft. He played college football at Kentucky.

Gardner has also been a member of the San Antonio Riders, Miami Dolphins, New York Jets and Philadelphia Eagles.

Early years
Gardner played high school football at Trinity High School in Louisville, Kentucky.

College career
Gardner played college football at the University of Kentucky for four seasons before being dismissed from the team his senior year (1989). He had been the only true freshman to letter his first year, and in his final season he was second on the team in sacks with four and eighth on the team with 49 tackles.

Personal
Gardner is the brother of former NFL fullback Carwell Gardner.

References

1968 births
Living people
American football defensive ends
Kentucky Wildcats football players
Tampa Bay Buccaneers players
San Antonio Riders players
Miami Dolphins players
New York Jets players
Philadelphia Eagles players
Players of American football from Louisville, Kentucky
Trinity High School (Louisville) alumni